Accursia (ca. 1230 - 1281) was an Italian jurist allegedly from Bologna, whose existence is debated. Accursia would have taught law in the Bologna studio, becoming a model of a cultured woman, capable of carrying out the activities reserved for men. Doubts about the existence of Accursia arose in the Eighteenth Century when the Camaldolese father Mauro Sarti, historian of the University of Bologna, found no trace of the jurist in the ancient documents of the studio. The earliest mention of Accursia is found in a document by the jurist Alberico da Rosciate, who nevertheless spoke of it as a rumor.

References

1230 births
1281 deaths
Italian women lawyers